The 45th Infantry Regiment was a unit of the Philippine Scouts in the Philippine Division.

History
The 45th along with the 57th Infantry Regiment were the first two infantry regiments of the Philippine Scouts which were formed after World War I. They were most well known for their participation in the Battle of the Philippines (1941-42) during World War II and their eventual surrender to Japanese forces on 10 April 1942.

Distinctive unit insignia
 Description
A Gold color metal and enamel device  in height consisting of a shield blazoned: Azure in sinister chief an abaca tree (Manila hemp plant) Proper in base a mullet of the field fimbriated Argent, on a canton of the last the Roman numeral X of the first behind which paleways a Roman sword in sheath Gules (for the 10th Infantry). Attached above the shield from a wreath Argent and Azure a demi-lion Or grasping in his dexter paw a burning torch Argent, fire Proper.
 Symbolism
The Regiment was organized in 1917 at Fort Benjamin Harrison, Indiana, by transfer of personnel from the 10th Infantry. The shield is blue for the Infantry and the parentage of the Regiment is shown by the canton. The early station of the Regiment was the Philippines; this is indicated by the abaca tree which is a source of great wealth in the Islands and which grows native in no other place. The star in the base of the shield is the blue star of the old First Philippine Infantry. The crest of the Harrison family, General and President William Henry and General and President Benjamin Harrison, is a lion. This is also the upper body of the crest of the Philippines, a sea lion. The device of the State of Indiana is a torch. These are combined to form the crest of the Regiment.
 Background
The distinctive unit insignia was approved on 12 September 1923. It was rescinded on 19 August 1975.

Coat of arms
Blazon
 Shield- Azure in sinister chief an abaca tree (Manila hemp plant) Proper in base a mullet of the field fimbriated Argent, on a canton of the last the Roman numeral X of the first behind which paleways a Roman sword in sheath Gules (for the 10th Infantry).
Crest- From a wreath Argent and Azure a demi-lion Or grasping in his dexter paw a burning torch Argent, fire Proper.
Motto STRONG TO ENDURE.
 Symbolism
 Shield- The Regiment was organized in 1917 at Fort Benjamin Harrison, Indiana, by transfer of personnel from the 10th Infantry. The shield is blue for the Infantry and the parentage of the Regiment is shown by the canton. The early station of the Regiment was the Philippines; this is indicated by the abaca tree which is a source of great wealth in the Islands and which grows native in no other place. The star in the base of the shield is the blue star of the old First Philippine Infantry.
 Crest- The crest of the Harrison family, General and President William Henry and General and President Benjamin Harrison, is a lion. This is also the upper body of the crest of the Philippines, a sea lion. The device of the State of Indiana is a torch. These are combined to form the crest of the Regiment.
 Background- The coat of arms was approved on 10 April 1922. It was rescinded on 19 August 1975.

See also
Military History of the Philippines

References

External links
Philippine Scouts Heritage Society

045
Military history of the Philippines
American military personnel of Filipino descent